Fergus Matthew Andrew Thomson (born 18 September 1983) is a Scottish rugby union hooker who plays for Glasgow Warriors. He was a member of the Scotland squad for the 2007 Rugby World Cup in France.

Thomson made his Celtic League début in November 2004 for Glasgow Warriors against the Border Reivers. He won his first international cap, aged 23, on 11 August 2007 against Ireland at Murrayfield; Scotland won the match 31–21.

In 2012 it was announced that Thomson would be leaving the Warriors at the end of the season alongside others, such as Rob Dewey, Richie Gray and Johnnie Beattie.

References

External links
 Glasgow Warriors profile
 Scotland profile

1983 births
Living people
Glasgow Warriors players
Howe of Fife RFC players
People educated at Bell Baxter High School
People from Cupar
Rugby union hookers
Rugby union players from Dundee
Scotland international rugby union players
Scottish rugby union players
West of Scotland FC players